Dirk Schweisfurth (born 24 October 1965) is a German sprinter. He competed in the men's 4 × 100 metres relay at the 1988 Summer Olympics representing West Germany.

References

1965 births
Living people
Athletes (track and field) at the 1988 Summer Olympics
German male sprinters
Olympic athletes of West Germany
Place of birth missing (living people)